"Soulmate" is a song written and produced by Natasha Bedingfield, Mads Hauge and David Tench for Bedingfield's second album, N.B. (2007). The song is written in the key of E-flat minor and set in  time. Bedingfield's vocals range from F3 to D5. The lyrics discuss if there is a soulmate for everyone and if Bedingfield will ever find the right partner. The song was released as the album's second single in July 2007. It was a commercial success, and the most successful single from N.B., reaching number seven in the United Kingdom and the top forty in the majority of the charts it entered. "Soulmate" is also the fourth single released in 2008 for the North American version of N.B., titled Pocketful of Sunshine.

The song gained popularity in the U.S after it was played in an episode of the highly rated MTV program The Hills. Promotion for the single started months after its release, in April 2009. She performed it on The Ellen DeGeneres Show, 15 April and Dancing with the Stars on 21 April. The song was also used throughout the final episode of season 5 of the TV series Medium and the finale of The Bachelorettes fourth season following Jesse Csincsak's proposal to DeAnna Pappas.

Critical reception
The song received mixed reviews from critics in the United Kingdom. Paul Taylor of the Manchester Evening News called the song "impassioned", but IndieLondon.co.uk called the track "far too sentimental" and rated it two out of five stars. In a review for the BBC, Lizzie Ennever named the song one of the "obviously 'not-so-great' tracks" from N.B., comparing it to Australian singer Tina Arena.

Chart performance
"Soulmate" debuted on the UK Singles Chart at number seventy on 17 June 2007, three weeks later the song climbed to the peak position of number seven. In Ireland, "Soulmate" debuted at number thirty-nine on 5 July 2007. It peaked at number twenty-eight a week later.

The single had moderate success in Europe. In Switzerland, "Soulmate" reached number seven and remained on the singles chart for a total of eighteen weeks. Elsewhere, it reached the top ten in Norway and the top twenty in Austria, Finland, Germany, Poland and Spain. In the United States, before even being released, it charted at No. 70 on Hot Digital Songs and No. 74 on the Pop 100, as well as on the Bubbling Under the Hot 100 at No. 3. Airplay increased and the single reached No. 14 on the Hot Adult Top 40 Tracks. "Soulmate" also debuted on the US Hot 100 at No. 96. In Germany, the single was certified Gold in year 2009, two years after the release. It is her first certificate in that country.

Music video
The music video was directed by Mark Pellington and was filmed in Los Angeles, California on 10 May and 11 May 2007. The video begins with a close-up of Bedingfield in a dark room. As the video proceeds, the camera slowly zooms out, revealing the room which contains a sofa and a mirror. Shots of Bedingfield in a grey dress in front of a light background, people kissing and skyscrapers are intercut throughout the video. It premiered 6 June 2007 on Yahoo! UK.

Formats and track listings

UK CD single
(88697111992; Released 2 July 2007)
 "Soulmate"
 "Chasing Cars" (Live at BBC Radio 1 Live Lounge)

Australian CD single
(88697125472; Released 6 August 2007)
 "Soulmate"
 "Chasing Cars" (Live at BBC Radio 1 Live Lounge)
 "I Wanna Have Your Babies" (Kardinal Beats Remix)
 "Soulmate" music video

Digital download
(Released 5 June 2007)
 "Soulmate"
 "Chasing Cars" (Live at BBC Radio 1 Live Lounge)

iTunes digital download
(Released 2 July 2007)
 "Soulmate" (AOL Session Live)

Official remixes
 "Soulmate" (Bimbo Jones Radio Edit)
 "Soulmate" (Bimbo Jones Club Mix)

Personnel
The following people contributed to "Soulmate".

Natasha Bedingfield – lead vocals, bongos, production
Patrick Leonard – production
Michelle Andrews – guitar
Mads Hauge – vocal production
David Tench – vocal production
Vanessa Freebirn – cello, string arrangements

Carla Campell, Neel Hammond – violin
Manny Marroquin – mixing
Jared Robbins – mixing assistant
Darnell McEuchgain – beatboxing
Kieran McGuiness – vocals

Charts and certifications

Weekly charts

Year-end charts

Certifications

Release history

References

External links
 "Soulmate" cover and lyrics on official website NatashaBedingfield.com

2000s ballads
2006 songs
2007 singles
Music videos directed by Mark Pellington
Natasha Bedingfield songs
Pop ballads
Song recordings produced by Patrick Leonard
Songs written by Mads Hauge
Songs written by Natasha Bedingfield
Songs about heartache
Songs about marriage